Taylor Vause (born September 28, 1991) is a Canadian professional ice hockey player. He is currently playing with the EC Bad Nauheim in the Deutsche Eishockey Liga 2 (DEL2).

Playing career 
Vause played major junior hockey with the Swift Current Broncos of the Western Hockey League (WHL), where he was awarded the 2011–12 Doug Wickenheiser Memorial Trophy as the WHL humanitarian of the year. He made his professional debut with the Texas Stars of the American Hockey League (AHL) near the end of the 2011–12 AHL season, and was with the Stars when they captured the 2013–14 Calder Cup as the AHL Champions.

After a season within the Calgary Flames affiliations, the Adirondack Flames and the Colorado Eagles, Vause signed his first contract abroad, agreeing to a one-year deal with Italian club, HC Bolzano of the EBEL on August 23, 2015. Upon the conclusion of the 2015–16 season, he signed a one-year deal with fellow EBEL outfit Vienna Capitals on June 1, 2016.

Career statistics

Awards and honours

References

External links

1991 births
Living people
Adirondack Flames players
Bolzano HC players
Canadian ice hockey forwards
Colorado Eagles players
Idaho Steelheads (ECHL) players
Swift Current Broncos players
Texas Stars players
Vienna Capitals players
Canadian expatriate ice hockey players in Austria
Canadian expatriate ice hockey players in Italy